Hamilton County High School (HCHS) is a public high school located at 5683 US Highway 129 in unincorporated Hamilton County, Florida, south of Jasper. A part of the Hamilton County School District (HCSD), its sports teams are nicknamed the "Fighting Trojans".

The school grounds houses the HCSD administrative offices. Serving middle school and high school levels, it was formerly at 1153 US Highway 41 N.W. in Jasper. The current building was scheduled to open in December 2003 or January 2004.

Gallery

References

Educational institutions in the United States with year of establishment missing
Public middle schools in Florida
Public high schools in Florida
Schools in Hamilton County, Florida